Mathieu Maertens (born 27 March 1995) is a Belgian footballer who plays as an attacking midfielder for OH Leuven.

Club career
Maertens made his senior debut for Cercle Brugge on 29 March 2014 in the Jupiler Pro League. He played the full game in a 4–0 away defeat against KV Kortrijk.

References

External links
 

1995 births
Living people
Association football midfielders
Belgian footballers
Cercle Brugge K.S.V. players
Oud-Heverlee Leuven players
Belgian Pro League players
Challenger Pro League players
Flemish sportspeople